Aphanandromyces is a fungal genus in the family Laboulbeniaceae. This is a monotypic genus, containing the single species Aphanandromyces audisioi.

See also
List of Laboulbeniaceae genera

References

Laboulbeniomycetes
Monotypic Laboulbeniales genera